Zoran Josipovic (born 25 August 1995) is a Swiss professional footballer who plays for Istra 1961 in the SuperSport HNL as a forward.

Career
A youth product of the Swiss clubs Lugano and FC Chiasso, Josipovic moved to the youth academy of Juventus in 2011. He spent his early career on loan with Novara, Lugano and Aarau. In 2016, he signed permanently with Aarau, moving to Chiasso the next season. He followed that up with stints at Beroe and Celta B. In January 2022, he returned to Lugano in the Swiss Super League. In 2022, he signed a contract with NK Istra until Jun 30, 2025.

Career statistics

Club

References

External links
 
 

1995 births
Living people
People from Mendrisio
Sportspeople from Ticino
Swiss men's footballers
Association football forwards
Switzerland youth international footballers
Swiss people of Croatian descent
Swiss expatriate footballers
Expatriate footballers in Italy
Expatriate footballers in Bulgaria
Expatriate footballers in Spain
Expatriate footballers in Belarus
Expatriate footballers in Croatia
Swiss expatriate sportspeople in Italy
Swiss expatriate sportspeople in Bulgaria
Swiss expatriate sportspeople in Spain
Serie B players
Swiss Challenge League players
First Professional Football League (Bulgaria) players
Segunda División B players
Juventus F.C. players
Novara F.C. players
FC Lugano players
FC Aarau players
FC Chiasso players
PFC Beroe Stara Zagora players
Celta de Vigo B players
FC Dinamo Minsk players
NK Istra 1961 players